Notiothemis robertsi is a species of dragonfly in the family Libellulidae. It is found in Cameroon, Central African Republic, the Republic of the Congo, the Democratic Republic of the Congo, Ivory Coast, Gabon, Ghana, Guinea, Kenya, Liberia, Nigeria, Tanzania, Uganda, and Zambia. Its natural habitat is subtropical or tropical moist lowland forests.

References

Libellulidae
Insects described in 1944
Taxonomy articles created by Polbot